Disbrow is a surname. Notable people with the surname include:

 Charles E. Disbrow (1812–1853), American politician
 James Disbrow (1948–2002), American restaurateur and figure skating official
 Lisa Disbrow American Air Force officer
 Louis Disbrow (1876–1939), American racecar driver